Pereshchepnovsky is a rural locality (a khutor) in Staroanninskoye Rural Settlement, Novoanninsky District, Volgograd Oblast, Russia. The population was 78 as of 2010. There are 2 streets.

Geography 
Pereshchepnovsky is located on the bank of the Buzuluk River, 21 km southwest of Novoanninsky (the district's administrative centre) by road. Borisovsky is the nearest rural locality.

References 

Rural localities in Novoanninsky District